Edmon Louis "Ed" Gallagher (born May 31, 1979) is an American professor of Christian Scripture at Heritage Christian University in Florence, Alabama.

Life 

Gallagher is an associate minister at the Sherrod Ave. Church of Christ in Florence. He married to Jodi and they have six children.

Education 

In 2001 Gallagher earned a B.A. (2001) and a M.A. (2002) at the Freed-Hardeman University. In 2007 he earned a M.Phil in Hebraic and Cognate Languages. From 2010 he holds a Ph.D. in the History of Biblical Interpretation at the Hebrew Union College-Jewish Institute of Religion under the tutelage of Adam Kamesar.

Bibliography

Books

Articles

References

Sources 

1979 births
Living people

Freed–Hardeman University alumni
Hebrew Union College – Jewish Institute of Religion alumni